N. M. Stark and Company, of Des Moines, Iowa, was a firm active in building bridges in Iowa.

History
Nathaniel McClure Stark (1863-1935) was born in Indianola, Iowa, and received an engineering degree from Iowa State Agricultural College (now Iowa State University). In 1888, he entered the bridge building industry as an agent for the King Iron Bridge and Manufacturing Company of Cleveland. He founded the N. M. Stark Company in 1894.

N. M. Stark had an effective monopoly on bridge construction in Marshall County, Iowa, from 1908 until a state law in 1913 stopped the practice.

A number of the firm's works are listed on the U.S. National Register of Historic Places.

Notable projects
Tremaine Bridge (1902), 280th Street over the Boone River, Webster City, Iowa, NRHP-listed
State Street Bridge (1903), East State Street over Willow Creek, Mason City, Iowa, NRHP-listed
Calamus Creek Bridge (1905), aka 325th Street Bridge, 325th Street over Calamus Creek, Maxwell, Iowa, NRHP-listed
Squaw Creek Bridge (1908), over Squaw Creek in Ames, Iowa
Honey Creek Bridge (1910), over Honey Creek at 105th Street, near Bangor, Iowa
Minerva Creek Bridge (1910), County Road S52 over Minerva Creek, Clemons, Iowa, NRHP-listed
Vine Street Bridge (1910), South Vine Street over Otter Creek, West Union, Iowa, NRHP-listed
East Indian Creek Bridge (1912), 260th Street over East Indian Creek, Nevada, Iowa, NRHP-listed
Eighth Street Bridge (1912), South Eighth Street over the Big Sioux River, Sioux Falls, South Dakota, NRHP-listed
Stewart Avenue Bridge (1914), North Carolina Avenue over the Winnebago River, Mason City, Iowa, NRHP-listed
Stoe Creek Bridge (1914), V Avenue over Stoe Creek, Oelwein, Iowa, NRHP-listed
Twin Bridge (1916), 130th Street over the Little Volga River, Fayette, Iowa, NRHP-listed
Rainbow Arch Bridge, aka South Third Avenue Bridge, over Linn Creek on South Third Avenue, Marshalltown, Iowa

References

Companies based in Iowa
Bridge companies
Construction and civil engineering companies of the United States
1894 establishments in Iowa
Construction and civil engineering companies established in 1894
American companies established in 1894